The Komani River, is a river part of the Great Kei River system in the Eastern Cape, South Africa. It is a short river originating north of Queenstown and joining up with the Klaas Smits River, just south of the same town.

The Bongolo Dam, is situated on the Komani River. Presently this river is part of the Mzimvubu to Keiskama Water Management Area.

See also 
Great Kei River
 List of rivers of South Africa

References

External links
SA Estuarine Land-cover: Great Kei Catchment
Towns of historical interest in the 'kei

Rivers of the Eastern Cape